Peter Gavigan (11 December 1897 – 2 March 1977) was a Scottish footballer who played in the Football League for Clapton Orient and Fulham as an outside right.

After three seasons in Scottish Division One with St Johnstone, two years at Dundee and a short period at Montrose, his final spell was with Dundee United in Division Two, signing on 9 December 1932 and making his debut against Brechin City the following day. He made 13 league appearances for the club in 1932–33 and was released at the end of the season.

Gavigan's grandson, Peter Loudon, is on the board of directors at St Johnstone.

References

1897 births
1977 deaths
Scottish footballers
Footballers from Glasgow
People from Gorbals
English Football League players
Vale of Clyde F.C. players
Scottish Junior Football Association players
Scottish Football League players
Fulham F.C. players
Leyton Orient F.C. players
St Johnstone F.C. players
Dundee F.C. players
Montrose F.C. players
Dundee United F.C. players
Bilston Town F.C. players
Association football outside forwards